Colombo Public Library is the largest public library in Sri Lanka, located in Colombo 07, Sri Lanka.

History
The first public library in the country was the 'United Service Library', which was established in 1813. It was exclusively used by civil and military officers of the Government stationed in Colombo and was housed in a building opposite the Queen's House on Janadhipathi Mawatha (formerly Kings Street). In 1829 the burghers opened the 'Colombo Pettah Library' in Pettah.  On 1 October 1924 E. W. Jayawardena moved a resolution at the Colombo Municipal Council to establish the Colombo Library. The Colonial Secretary, Sir Cecil Clementi, called a meeting of subscribers of both libraries and it was agreed to hand over their books to the new library, which was to be run as a department of the Colombo Council.

The Colombo Library was opened on 10 August 1925 in a mansion, 'Sirinivasa', built by Mudaliyar Simon Fernando Sri Chandrasekera (who bequested the building to the government), on Sir Marcus Fernando Mawatha (formerly Edinburgh Crescent). At its formation the library had three departments, the Reading Room, the Lending Room and the Reference Library. It had approximately 16,000 books, 94 members,  and seven staff, with S. C. Blok as the first principal librarian. In 1980 the library was relocated to a newly constructed building adjoining Viharamahadevi Park (formerly Victoria Park).

Timeline 

In 2016, Library was fully automated with Koha FOSS Library Management Library System  with a consultancy of Open University of Sri Lanka.
In 2017, The Digital Libraries Project was launched at Colombo Public library by the Information Communication Technology Agency of Sri Lanka (ICTA) in collaboration with National Library and Documentation Services Board. In March 2019, the Colombo Digital Library officially launched.
In 2020, The Library System was upgraded the latest versions under the guidance with The Open University of Sri Lanka

Branches 

 Kirulapone Library (High level road, Kirulapone, Colombo 06)
 Mihindu Mawatha Library (Mihindu Mawatha, Colombo 12)
 Elliot Place Library (Elliot Place, Colombo 12)
 Kettarama Library (Kettarama Mawatha, Colombo 14)
 Mattakkuliya (Central Road, Colombo 15)
 Gunasinghe Park Little Library (Gunasinghe Park, Colombo 11)
 Kotahena Library (Kotahena, Colombo 13)
 Sri Sucharitha Library (Sucharitha Mawatha, Colombo 12)
 Peterson Lane Library (Peterson lane, Colombo 06)
 Belmont Street Library  (Belmont Street, Colombo 12)
 Henry Pediris Children's Library (Pediris Park, Colombo 05)
 Bonavista Library (Bonavista Park, Colombo 15)
 Eli House Park Library

See also
 List of libraries in Sri Lanka.

References

.

External links 
http://pdfs.island.lk/2008/07/15/p11.pdf
 Colombo Public Library

Libraries in Colombo District
Library buildings completed in 1980
Cultural buildings in Colombo
Government buildings in Colombo